Mati Kuulberg (9 July 1947 Tallinn – 14 June 2001 Tallinn) was an Estonian composer, violinist and educator.

In 1966 he graduated from Tallinn State Conservatory in music composition speciality. 1966-1974 he was a violinist at Eesti Televisioon and Radio Symphony Orchestra.

1970-1998 he taught music theory and composition in two schools: Georg Ots Tallinn Music School and Tallinn Music High School. Students: Mirjam Tally, Timo Steiner and Mihkel Kerem.

Works

 1971: Symphony No. 1
 1977: Symphony No. 2
 1978: Symphony Np. 3

References

1947 births
2001 deaths
20th-century Estonian composers
Estonian violinists
Estonian educators
Estonian Academy of Music and Theatre alumni
Musicians from Tallinn